Saint-Pierre-du-Mont is a commune in the Calvados department in the Normandy region in northwestern France.

History

World War II
During World War II, the area was heavily bombarded on several occasions during May and early June 1944 by Allied bombers, attacking German coastal fortifications of the Atlantic Wall just north of the commune along the coast.

Saint-Pierre-du-Mont was liberated by American Ranger forces on 7 June 1944 after moving inland from Pointe du Hoc.  The area north of the commune was used by the United States Army Air Forces as a combat airfield, known as Advanced Landing Ground "A-1" (Saint-Pierre-du-Mont).   The airfield was used between early June and September 1944.  It was abandoned after the Americans moved east into Central France with the advancing Allied Armies.

Population

See also
Communes of the Calvados department

References

Communes of Calvados (department)
Calvados communes articles needing translation from French Wikipedia